Emma Grede is a British businesswoman, entrepreneur and fashion designer. She is the CEO and co-founder of the denim company Good American, a founding partner of Skims, and co-founder of Safely.

Early life
Grede was born and raised in East London, England. She is the daughter of Jenny-Lee Findlay, an English mother who worked for Morgan Stanley; and a Jamaican and Trinidadian father.  She has three younger sisters Charlotte, Rachelle, and Katie-Beth.  She was raised by her mother in the Plaistow neighborhood of London. She studied business at the London College of Fashion. After securing an internship at Gucci she dropped out of college.

Career
After initially working as a producer at fashion show and events company Inca Productions, in 2008 Grede founded and was CEO of Independent Talent Brand (ITB) Worldwide, a London-based talent management and entertainment marketing agency  In 2018, ITB was acquired by Rogers & Cowan, and Grede exited the company.

Around 2015, Grede proposed an idea for a denim company to Kris Jenner, explaining that she wanted to partner with Jenner's daughter Khloé Kardashian. Grede and Kardashian launched Good American in 2016, as a women's clothing company focused on size inclusivity and body positivity, with Grede as CEO. The company expanded from strictly selling denim jeans to include dresses, activewear, tops, swimwear, sleepwear, and shoes in its line. They also created the size 15 to accommodate more body types.

Grede is a founding partner of Skims, a shapewear brand founded by her husband Jens Grede and Kim Kardashian in 2019. Grede is the company's chief product officer. Along with Kris Jenner and Chrissy Teigen, Grede is the founder of Safely, a brand of plant-based cleaning and self-care products that was launched in March 2021.

Grede is a guest shark on the first episode of season 13 and the fourteenth episode of season 14 of the reality television series Shark Tank. She is the first black woman on the show. She is chairwoman of the 15 Percent Pledge, an initiative for retailers to reserve 15% of their shelf space for Black-owned businesses.

Personal life
Grede is married to Jens Grede, the Swedish co-founder of Skims and denim brand, Frame. 
They moved to Los Angeles in 2017. They have four children: Grey, Lola, and twins Lake and Rafferty.

Awards and Recognitions 
On November 2022, Emma along with her husband Jens Grede and Kim Kardashian won the first 'Innovation Award' presented by Amazon Fashion for Skims at the CFDA Awards in New York.

References 

1982 births
Living people
Businesspeople from London
British women chief executives
English businesspeople in fashion
Black British fashion people
Alumni of the London College of Fashion
British people of Jamaican descent
British people of Trinidad and Tobago descent